Josefa Pérez Carmona (born 5 January 1977 in Almería) is a Spanish female weightlifter, competing in the 75 kg category and representing Spain at international competitions. 

She participated at the 2000 Summer Olympics in the 63 kg event. She competed at world championships, most recently at the 2002 World Weightlifting Championships.

Major results

References

External links
 
todor66.com
Getty Images

1977 births
Living people
Spanish female weightlifters
Weightlifters at the 2000 Summer Olympics
Olympic weightlifters of Spain
Sportspeople from Almería
Mediterranean Games bronze medalists for Spain
Mediterranean Games medalists in weightlifting
Competitors at the 2001 Mediterranean Games
21st-century Spanish women